Cucurbit may refer to:-

A plant of the family Cucurbitaceae
The lower part of an alembic
Cucurbit flute, Chinese musical instrument